is a song by the J-pop group Every Little Thing, released as their 21st single on May 15, 2002. It was used as the theme song of the TBS drama Shiawase no Shippo.

Track listing
  (Words - Kaori Mochida / music - Kazuhito Kikuchi)
 Time Trip  (Words & music - Kaori Mochida)
  (Cbsmgrfc Fatback mix)
 Time Trip 僕が僕であるために  (Sunaga't Experience du jazz)
  (instrumental)
 Time Trip 僕が僕であるために (instrumental)

Chart positions

External links
  information at Avex Network.
  information at Oricon.

2002 singles
Every Little Thing (band) songs
Songs written by Kaori Mochida
Japanese television drama theme songs